Dunklin may refer to:

 Dunklin County, Missouri, United States
 Daniel Dunklin (1790–1844), American politician
 James Dunklin House, a historic home in South Carolina, United States

See also
 Dunkin (disambiguation)